Layton Julius Ndukwu (born 7 September 1998) is an English professional footballer who plays as a winger for Barwell.

Early life
Ndukwu was educated at City of Leicester College.

Club career
Ndukwu is a product of the Leicester City academy. He joined Southend United on a season-long loan in August 2019, making his league debut on 10 August 2019. In January 2020, Ndukwu was recalled from his loan after a lack of playing time.

In June 2021, it was announced that Ndukwu would be released from Leicester City upon expiry of his contract at the end of the season. He subsequently spent time on trial at Portsmouth, however he was not offered a contract.

In August 2022, Ndukwu returned to football to joining Albanian Kategoria Superiore side Kukësi.

In March 2023, Ndukwu returned to England to join Southern Football League Premier Division Central club Barwell.

International career
Ndukwu has represented England at under-16 and under-17 level. He is also eligible to represent Nigeria at international level.

Career statistics

Notes

References

External links

1998 births
Living people
English footballers
English people of Nigerian descent
Black British sportspeople
Association football wingers
England youth international footballers
Leicester City F.C. players
Southend United F.C. players
FK Kukësi players
Barwell F.C. players
English Football League players
Kategoria Superiore players
English expatriate footballers
Expatriate footballers in Albania